Miltochrista duopunctata is a moth of the family Erebidae. It was described by Georg Semper in 1899. It is found in the Philippines.

References

 

duopunctata
Moths described in 1899
Moths of Asia